The Investment Commission of India (ICI) is a three-member investment commission, set up in the Ministry of Finance in December 2004 by the Government of India. Ratan Tata is the Chairman and Deepak Parekh and Dr. Ashok Sekhar Ganguly, former Hindustan Lever chairman, are members.

History 
The Investment Commission has been set up to enhance and facilitate investment in India. The Commission makes recommendations to the Government of India on policies and procedures to facilitate investment, recommends projects and investment proposals that should be fast-tracked/mentored, and promotes India as an investment destination.

ICI is now abolished.

See also
 Planning commission of India

References

Indian commissions and inquiries
Foreign trade of India
Inward investment
Investment in India